Constituency WR-17 is a reserved seat for women in the Khyber Pakhtunkhwa Assembly.

2013
Rashida Riffat

See also
 Constituency PK-12 (Nowshera-I)
 Constituency PK-13 (Nowshera-II)
 Constituency PK-14 (Nowshera-III)
 Constituency PK-15 (Nowshera-IV)
 Constituency PK-16 (Nowshera-V)

References

Khyber Pakhtunkhwa Assembly constituencies